Hima Ikimotu Douglas (also known as Himalea I Takelesi) (born 1946 or 1947) is a Niuean broadcaster, politician, and diplomat. He is Speaker of the Niue Assembly.

Douglas was educated in New Zealand and holds an accounting degree. He worked as a broadcaster, a broadcasting consultant, and a public servant for the South Pacific Commission and Niuean government, and for many years was manager of the Broadcasting Corporation of Niue. He was elected to the Niue Assembly at the 1999 Niuean general election, but resigned partway through his term to become Niue's first High Commissioner to New Zealand. Following his return to Niue he was re-elected at the 2005 election, but was not re-elected in the Niuean general election of June 2008. 

In June 2020, he was elected Speaker of the Niue Assembly, replacing Togiavalu Pihigia.

References 

Year of birth missing (living people)
Members of the Niue Assembly
Living people
High Commissioners of Niue to New Zealand
Place of birth missing (living people)
Speakers of the Niue Assembly